Membrane androgen receptors (mARs) are a group of G protein-coupled receptors (GPCRs) which bind and are activated by testosterone and/or other androgens. Unlike the androgen receptor (AR), a nuclear receptor which mediates its effects via genomic mechanisms, mARs are cell surface receptors which rapidly alter cell signaling via modulation of intracellular signaling cascades. Known or proposed mARs include ZIP9 and GPRC6A.

GPRC6A has been found to be involved in testicular function and prostate cancer. mARs have also been found to be expressed in breast cancer cells. Activation of mARs by testosterone has been found to increase skeletal muscle strength, indicating potential anabolic effects. mARs have also been implicated in the antigonadotropic effects of androgens. 3α-Androstanediol, an active metabolite of dihydrotestosterone (DHT) and a weak androgen as well as a neurosteroid via acting as a positive allosteric modulator of the GABAA receptor, rapidly influences sexual receptivity and behavior in animals, an effect that is GABAA receptor-dependent.

See also
 Membrane steroid receptor

References

G protein-coupled receptors
Human proteins